Championnat National de 2ème Division (or Rwandan Second Division) is the second division of Rwandan football (soccer), and it is organized by the Rwandese Association Football Federation.

Teams 2018
Pepiniere FC
Rwamagana City
Sorwathe FC
Unity SC
Etoile de l'est
Vision FC
Gasabo FC
Aspor FC
Esperance SK
Gitikinyoni
Akagera FC
Nyagatare FC
Intare FC
SEC Academy
Interforce FC
AS Muhanga
Vision JN
La Jeunesse
United Stars
UNR FC
Heroes FC
Hope FC
Rugende FC

References

External links

2
Second level football leagues in Africa